Reggie Strickland (born September 4, 1968) (aliases Reggie Buse and Reggie Raglin) is an American former professional boxer.

Professional career
Strickland began his professional career in 1987.  He was featured in an article in The New York Times, along with journeymen Buck Smith and Verdell Smith, detailing the life of a journeyman boxer, or tomato can. It was noted that in Strickland's many fights, he sometimes used aliases, including Reggie Buse and Reggie Raglin. The Wall Street Journal also referenced Strickland in a story about Kristian Laight, a British boxer who had fought 300 fighters.

Throughout his career he also fought future world champions Tavoris Cloud, Randall Bailey, Cory Spinks, Raúl Márquez and Keith Holmes.

Reggie's half-brother Jerry Strickland was also a professional boxer, who also had over 100 losses in his career. Nicolyn Armstrong, Reggie's common law wife at the time of a 2000 "HBO Real Sports" piece, has also boxed professionally. There is also another Reggie Strickland who boxes as a heavyweight that is purportedly Strickland's cousin. A nephew Jay Strickland (Jerry's son) has also boxed professionally.

Professional boxing record

|-
| style="text-align:center;" colspan="8"|66 Wins (14 knockouts, 52 decisions), 276 Losses (25 knockouts, 251 decisions), 17 Draws, 4 No Contests 
|-  style="text-align:center; background:#e3e3e3;"
|  style="border-style:none none solid solid; "|Result
|  style="border-style:none none solid solid; "|Record
|  style="border-style:none none solid solid; "|Opponent
|  style="border-style:none none solid solid; "|Type
|  style="border-style:none none solid solid; "|Round
|  style="border-style:none none solid solid; "|Date
|  style="border-style:none none solid solid; "|Location
|  style="border-style:none none solid solid; "|Notes
|- align=left
|Loss
|
|align=left| Dante Craig
|UD
|6
|15/10/2005
|align=left| Grand Victoria Casino, Rising Sun, Indiana
|align=left|
|-
|Loss
|
|align=left| Daniel Pérez
|UD
|6
|07/10/2005
|align=left| Farm Bureau Building, Indianapolis, Indiana
|align=left|
|-
|Loss
|
|align=left| Daryl Salmon
|UD
|8
|13/07/2005
|align=left| Majestic Star Casino, Gary, Indiana
|align=left|
|-
|Loss
|
|align=left| Tavoris Cloud
|UD
|4
|06/05/2005
|align=left| Farm Bureau Building, Indianapolis, Indiana
|align=left|
|-
|Loss
|
|align=left| Saeed Hawkins
|UD
|4
|01/03/2005
|align=left| Pepsi Coliseum, Indianapolis, Indiana
|align=left|
|-
|Loss
|
|align=left| Ed Perry
|UD
|6
|19/02/2005
|align=left| Riehle Brothers Pavilion, Lafayette, Indiana
|align=left|
|-
|Loss
|
|align=left| Quentin Smith
|UD
|8
|28/01/2005
|align=left| Farm Bureau Building, Indianapolis, Indiana
|align=left|
|-
|Loss
|
|align=left| Butch Hajicek
|UD
|6
|18/12/2004
|align=left| Minnesota Sports Cafe, Fridley, Minnesota
|align=left|
|-
|Loss
|
|align=left| Troy Weida
|UD
|8
|08/10/2004
|align=left| Lakeside Casino, Osceola, Iowa
|align=left|
|-
|Win
|
|align=left| Tyrone Roberts
|UD
|6
|30/09/2004
|align=left| Prairie Meadows Racetrack, Altoona, Iowa
|align=left|
|-
|Loss
|
|align=left| Jeff Yeoman
|UD
|4
|26/09/2004
|align=left| Majestic Star Casino, Gary, Indiana
|align=left|
|-
|Loss
|
|align=left| Anthony Shuler
|UD
|6
|18/09/2004
|align=left| Riehle Brothers Pavilion, Lafayette, Indiana
|align=left|
|-
|Loss
|
|align=left| Jeff Baker
|UD
|6
|10/09/2004
|align=left| Farm Bureau Building, Indianapolis, Indiana
|align=left|
|-
| Draw
|
|align=left| Jimmy Holmes
|MD
|4
|11/07/2004
|align=left| Majestic Star Casino, Gary, Indiana
|align=left|
|-
|Loss
|
|align=left| Gregory Holmes
|UD
|4
|25/06/2004
|align=left| Genesis Center, Gary, Indiana
|align=left|
|-
|Loss
|
|align=left| James Butler
|UD
|6
|07/05/2004
|align=left| Farm Bureau Building, Indianapolis, Indiana
|align=left|
|-
|Loss
|
|align=left| Lenord Pierre
|UD
|6
|30/04/2004
|align=left| Hammond Civic Center, Hammond, Indiana
|align=left|
|-
|Loss
|
|align=left| Tracy Sneed
|UD
|6
|17/04/2004
|align=left| Comanche Casino, Lawton, Oklahoma
|align=left|
|-
|Win
|
|align=left| Toris Smith
|TKO
|5
|06/04/2004
|align=left| Omni New Daisy Theater, Memphis, Tennessee
|align=left|
|-
|Loss
|
|align=left| Kendall Gould
|UD
|4
|27/03/2004
|align=left| Mohican North Star Casino, Bowler, Wisconsin
|align=left|
|-
|Loss
|
|align=left| Thomas Wilt
|UD
|6
|18/03/2004
|align=left| Columbia Club, Indianapolis, Indiana
|align=left|
|-
| Draw
|
|align=left| Robbie Tovar
|PTS
|8
|02/03/2004
|align=left| Pepsi Coliseum, Indianapolis, Indiana
|align=left|
|-
|Loss
|
|align=left| Darnell Wilson
|UD
|6
|07/02/2004
|align=left| Riehle Brothers Pavilion, Lafayette, Indiana
|align=left|
|-
|Loss
|
|align=left| Chris Lytle
|UD
|6
|03/02/2004
|align=left| 8 Second Saloon, Indianapolis, Indiana
|align=left|
|-
|Loss
|
|align=left| Raul Frank
|UD
|8
|30/01/2004
|align=left| Farm Bureau Building, Indianapolis, Indiana
|align=left|
|-
|Loss
|
|align=left| Tim Pilant
|UD
|4
|13/12/2003
|align=left| Mid America All Indian Center, Council Bluffs, Iowa
|align=left|
|-
|Win
|
|align=left| Mike Wilson
|TKO
|1
|29/11/2003
|align=left| Boot Scootin' Bingo Parlor, Lafayette, Indiana
|align=left|
|-
|Loss
|
|align=left| Joe Hutchinson
|UD
|6
|25/11/2003
|align=left| Pepsi Coliseum, Indianapolis, Indiana
|align=left|
|-
|Win
|
|align=left| Anthony Lee Howard
|TKO
|3
|15/11/2003
|align=left| Hammond Civic Center, Hammond, Indiana
|align=left|
|-
|Loss
|
|align=left| Jonathan Corn
|SD
|8
|18/10/2003
|align=left| Seven Clans Casino, Red Lake, Minnesota
|align=left|
|-
|Win
|
|align=left| Mike Stone
|TKO
|5
|26/09/2003
|align=left| Farm Bureau Building, Indianapolis, Indiana
|align=left|
|-
|Loss
|
|align=left| Anthony Bonsante
|UD
|8
|06/09/2003
|align=left| Minnesota Sports Cafe, Fridley, Minnesota
|align=left|
|-
|Loss
|
|align=left| Warren Moore
|UD
|8
|22/08/2003
|align=left| McBride Hall, Gary, Indiana
|align=left|
|-
|Loss
|
|align=left| Mohammed Kayongo
|UD
|6
|25/07/2003
|align=left| University of Minnesota Armory, Saint Paul, Minnesota
|align=left|
|-
|Loss
|
|align=left| Alex Bunema
|UD
|10
|11/07/2003
|align=left| Dixie Junior College, Saint George, Utah
|align=left|
|-
|Loss
|
|align=left| Randall Bailey
|UD
|8
|17/05/2003
|align=left| Hammond Civic Center, Hammond, Indiana
|align=left|
|-
|Win
|
|align=left| Anthony Lee Howard
|UD
|4
|03/05/2003
|align=left| Seven Clans Casino, Red Lake, Minnesota
|align=left|
|-
|Win
|
|align=left| Wayne Bogard
|TKO
|3
|18/04/2003
|align=left| Farm Bureau Building, Indianapolis, Indiana
|align=left|
|-
|Loss
|
|align=left| Warren Moore
|UD
|4
|12/04/2003
|align=left| Sportszone, Topeka, Kansas
|align=left|
|-
|Loss
|
|align=left| Nathan Martin
|UD
|5
|05/04/2003
|align=left| Sioux City Municipal Auditorium, Sioux City, Iowa
|align=left|
|-
|Loss
|
|align=left| Jason Parillo
|UD
|6
|13/03/2003
|align=left| Columbia Club, Indianapolis, Indiana
|align=left|
|-
|Loss
|
|align=left| Anthony Shuler
|UD
|6
|06/03/2003
|align=left| Farm Bureau Building, Indianapolis, Indiana
|align=left|
|-
|Loss
|
|align=left| Rocky Martinez
|UD
|6
|25/02/2003
|align=left| Pepsi Coliseum, Indianapolis, Indiana
|align=left|
|-
|Win
|
|align=left| Ray Shanks
|TKO
|4
|22/02/2003
|align=left| World War II Victory Museum, Auburn, Indiana
|align=left|
|-
|Loss
|
|align=left| Shannon Landberg
|UD
|8
|15/02/2003
|align=left| Zorah Shrine Temple, Terre Haute, Indiana
|align=left|
|-
|Loss
|
|align=left| Adrian Helms
|UD
|10
|08/02/2003
|align=left| Johanning Civic Center, Kokomo, Indiana
|align=left|
|-
|Loss
|
|align=left| Grover Wiley
|UD
|6
|24/01/2003
|align=left| Roy Wilkins Auditorium, Saint Paul, Minnesota
|align=left|
|-
|Loss
|
|align=left| Rubin Williams
|UD
|6
|01/11/2002
|align=left| Roy Wilkins Auditorium, Saint Paul, Minnesota
|align=left|
|-
|Loss
|
|align=left| Craig Cummings
|UD
|6
|25/10/2002
|align=left| Lakeside Casino, Osceola, Iowa
|align=left|
|-
|Loss
|
|align=left| James Webb
|UD
|4
|12/10/2002
|align=left| The Trap, Nashville, Tennessee
|align=left|
|-
|Loss
|
|align=left| Adrian Helms
|UD
|6
|27/09/2002
|align=left| Farm Bureau Building, Indianapolis, Indiana
|align=left|
|-
|Loss
|
|align=left| Leonard Townsend
|UD
|6
|06/09/2002
|align=left| Roy Wilkins Auditorium, Saint Paul, Minnesota
|align=left|
|-
|Win
|
|align=left| Conley Person
|KO
|6
|28/06/2002
|align=left| Farm Bureau Building, Indianapolis, Indiana
|align=left|
|-
|Win
|
|align=left| Ed Lee Humes
|PTS
|4
|22/06/2002
|align=left| Expo Five Arena, Louisville, Kentucky
|align=left|
|-
|Loss
|
|align=left| Ronnie Warrior Jr.
|MD
|4
|01/08/2001
|align=left| Ameristar Casino, Kansas City, Missouri
|align=left|
|-
|Win
|
|align=left| Mike Cooley
|SD
|4
|24/06/2001
|align=left| Ameristar Casino, Council Bluffs, Iowa
|align=left|
|-
|Loss
|
|align=left| Boyd Davis
|UD
|6
|16/06/2001
|align=left| Treasure Island Casino, Red Wing, Minnesota
|align=left|
|-
|Loss
|
|align=left| Nick C. Cook
|UD
|6
|28/04/2001
|align=left| LaPorte Civic Center, LaPorte, Indiana
|align=left|
|-
|Loss
|
|align=left| Michael Davis
|UD
|8
|24/04/2001
|align=left| Indiana State Fairgrounds, Indianapolis, Indiana
|align=left|
|-
|Loss
|
|align=left| Ted Solheid
|PTS
|4
|13/04/2001
|align=left| Oakdale, Minnesota
|align=left|
|-
|Loss
|
|align=left| Eric Howard
|PTS
|6
|07/04/2001
|align=left| Jamestown, Tennessee
|align=left|
|-
|Win
|
|align=left| Scott Sala
|TKO
|9
|21/02/2001
|align=left| Columbia Club, Indianapolis, Indiana
|align=left|
|-
|Win
|
|align=left| Scott Sala
|UD
|4
|10/02/2001
|align=left| Greensburg Jr. High, Greensburg, Indiana
|align=left|
|-
|Loss
|
|align=left| Shannon Landberg
|UD
|8
|27/01/2001
|align=left| Johanning Civic Center, Kokomo, Indiana
|align=left|
|-
|Loss
|
|align=left| Nick C. Cook
|UD
|8
|16/12/2000
|align=left| LaPorte Civic Center, LaPorte, Indiana
|align=left|
|-
|Win
|
|align=left| Ruben Ruiz
|UD
|8
|21/11/2000
|align=left| Pepsi Coliseum, Indianapolis, Indiana
|align=left|
|-
|Loss
|
|align=left| Randy Eckmann
|SD
|4
|13/10/2000
|align=left| Harvey's Casino, Council Bluffs, Iowa
|align=left|
|-
|Loss
|
|align=left| Donnie Penelton
|UD
|8
|03/10/2000
|align=left| Farm Bureau Building, Indianapolis, Indiana
|align=left|
|-
|Loss
|
|align=left| John Long
|UD
|6
|17/07/2000
|align=left| Station Casino, Saint Charles, Missouri
|align=left|
|-
|Loss
|
|align=left| George Blades
|UD
|6
|20/06/2000
|align=left| Farm Bureau Building, Indianapolis, Indiana
|align=left|
|-
|Loss
|
|align=left| Rob Bleakley
|PTS
|6
|06/06/2000
|align=left| Memphis, Tennessee
|align=left|
|-
|Loss
|
|align=left| Charles Tanner
|UD
|8
|26/05/2000
|align=left| LaPorte Civic Center, LaPorte, Indiana
|align=left|
|-
|Loss
|
|align=left| Troy Speakman
|PTS
|4
|27/04/2000
|align=left| Club Dance, Reynoldsburg, Ohio
|align=left|
|-
|Win
|
|align=left| Myron Killibrew
|UD
|4
|22/04/2000
|align=left| Johanning Civic Center, Kokomo, Indiana
|align=left|
|-
|Loss
|
|align=left| Maurice Brantley
|UD
|8
|05/04/2000
|align=left| Station Casino, Kansas City, Missouri
|align=left|
|-
|Win
|
|align=left| Sean Crowdus
|PTS
|4
|29/02/2000
|align=left| Pepsi Coliseum, Indianapolis, Indiana
|align=left|
|-
| NC
|
|align=left| Joe Hutchinson
|NC
|4
|24/02/2000
|align=left| Columbia Club, Indianapolis, Indiana
|align=left|
|-
|Win
|
|align=left| Bobby Vinson
|SD
|4
|29/01/2000
|align=left| Zorah Shrine Temple, Terre Haute, Indiana
|align=left|
|-
|Loss
|
|align=left| Fernando Zúñiga
|UD
|8
|19/01/2000
|align=left| Coyote's, Louisville, Kentucky
|align=left|
|-
|Loss
|
|align=left| Anton Robinson
|UD
|4
|08/01/2000
|align=left| Peel's Palace, Erlanger, Kentucky
|align=left|
|-
|Loss
|
|align=left| Anton Robinson
|UD
|6
|01/12/1999
|align=left| Coyote's, Louisville, Kentucky
|align=left|
|-
|Loss
|
|align=left| Charles Brewer
|TKO
|2
|29/10/1999
|align=left| Farm Bureau Building, Indianapolis, Indiana
|align=left|
|-
|Win
|
|align=left| Chris Rosenbalm
|PTS
|6
|23/10/1999
|align=left| Gallatin, Tennessee
|align=left|
|-
|Loss
|
|align=left| Jerry Brown
|UD
|8
|02/10/1999
|align=left| Casino Aztar, Kokomo, Indiana
|align=left|
|-
|Loss
|
|align=left| Jose Spearman
|UD
|8
|19/09/1999
|align=left| Post Road Center, Indianapolis, Indiana
|align=left|
|-
|Loss
|
|align=left| Rich Boruff
|UD
|8
|04/09/1999
|align=left| Johanning Civic Center, Kokomo, Indiana
|align=left|
|-
|Loss
|
|align=left| Grover Wiley
|UD
|6
|20/08/1999
|align=left| Harvey's Casino, Council Bluffs, Iowa
|align=left|
|-
|Loss
|
|align=left| Billy Waltz
|PTS
|12
|18/08/1999
|align=left| Nashville, Tennessee
|align=left|
|-
| Draw
|
|align=left| Jeffrey Hemphill
|PTS
|4
|16/08/1999
|align=left| Louisville, Kentucky
|align=left|
|-
|Loss
|
|align=left| Damon Reed
|UD
|6
|30/06/1999
|align=left| Station Casino, Kansas City, Missouri
|align=left|
|-
|Loss
|
|align=left| Jerry Brown
|SD
|6
|30/04/1999
|align=left| Evansville, Indiana
|align=left|
|-
|Loss
|
|align=left| Ted Muller
|UD
|6
|27/04/1999
|align=left| Davenport, Iowa
|align=left|
|-
|Loss
|
|align=left| Jonathan Reid
|PTS
|6
|20/03/1999
|align=left| Gallatin, Tennessee
|align=left|
|-
|Loss
|
|align=left| Karl Willis
|PTS
|6
|03/03/1999
|align=left| Nashville, Tennessee
|align=left|
|-
|Win
|
|align=left| Tim Bryan
|UD
|8
|02/03/1999
|align=left| Pepsi Coliseum, Indianapolis, Indiana
|align=left|
|-
|Loss
|
|align=left| Harold Roberts
|UD
|4
|24/02/1999
|align=left| Station Casino, Kansas City, Missouri
|align=left|
|-
|Win
|
|align=left| Greg Fields
|UD
|4
|20/02/1999
|align=left| Johanning Civic Center, Kokomo, Indiana
|align=left|
|-
|Loss
|
|align=left| James Crawford
|UD
|8
|10/02/1999
|align=left| Meskwaki Casino, Tama, Iowa
|align=left|
|-
|Loss
|
|align=left| Sammy Sparkman
|PTS
|6
|27/01/1999
|align=left| Nashville, Tennessee
|align=left|
|-
|Loss
|
|align=left| Rich Boruff
|SD
|4
|23/01/1999
|align=left| Zorah Shrine Temple, Terre Haute, Indiana
|align=left|
|-
|Loss
|
|align=left| Lavell Finger
|UD
|6
|15/01/1999
|align=left| Fiesta Palace, Waukegan, Illinois
|align=left|
|-
|Loss
|
|align=left| Reggie Green
|PTS
|8
|19/12/1998
|align=left| Lincoln, Nebraska
|align=left|
|-
|Loss
|
|align=left| Carlos Sanabria
|UD
|4
|15/12/1998
|align=left| Fifty Yard Line, Harvey, Illinois
|align=left|
|-
|Win
|
|align=left| Greg Fields
|TKO
|2
|12/12/1998
|align=left| Post Road Center, Indianapolis, Indiana
|align=left|
|-
| NC
|
|align=left| Tony Menefee
|ND
|6
|01/12/1998
|align=left| Remington's, Topeka, Kansas
|align=left|
|-
|Loss
|
|align=left| Donnie Penelton
|SD
|4
|28/11/1998
|align=left| Zorah Shrine Temple, Terre Haute, Indiana
|align=left|
|-
|Win
|
|align=left| Tim Bryan
|UD
|8
|24/11/1998
|align=left| Pepsi Coliseum, Indianapolis, Indiana
|align=left|
|-
|Loss
|
|align=left| Rico Cason
|PTS
|6
|14/11/1998
|align=left| Gallatin, Tennessee
|align=left|
|-
|Loss
|
|align=left| Derrick Harmon
|TKO
|2
|08/10/1998
|align=left| Harrah's Casino, Kansas City, Missouri
|align=left|
|-
|Loss
|
|align=left| Hugo Pineda
|TKO
|3
|29/09/1998
|align=left| Farm Bureau Building, Indianapolis, Indiana
|align=left|
|-
|Loss
|
|align=left| Mohamed Benguesmia
|TKO
|2
|07/08/1998
|align=left| Park West, Chicago, Illinois
|align=left|
|-
|Loss
|
|align=left| Boyd Davis
|PTS
|6
|31/07/1998
|align=left| Minneapolis, Minnesota
|align=left|
|-
|Loss
|
|align=left| Shannon Landberg
|PTS
|6
|18/07/1998
|align=left| Kokomo, Indiana
|align=left|
|-
|Loss
|
|align=left| Leonard Townsend
|PTS
|8
|14/07/1998
|align=left| Indianapolis, Indiana
|align=left|
|-
| Draw
|
|align=left| Hector Ramirez
|PTS
|10
|18/06/1998
|align=left| North Vernon, Indiana
|align=left|
|-
| Draw
|
|align=left| Brent Cooper
|PTS
|4
|16/06/1998
|align=left| Nashville, Tennessee
|align=left|
|-
|Loss
|
|align=left| Anton Robinson
|PTS
|6
|10/06/1998
|align=left| Louisville, Kentucky
|align=left|
|-
|Loss
|
|align=left| Johnny Rivera-Montanez
|UD
|6
|04/06/1998
|align=left| The Showboat, East Chicago, Indiana
|align=left|
|-
|Loss
|
|align=left| Cory Spinks
|UD
|4
|02/06/1998
|align=left| The Ambassador, Saint Louis, Missouri
|align=left|
|-
|Loss
|
|align=left| Tony Menefee
|SD
|6
|26/05/1998
|align=left| Sac and Fox Casino, Powhattan, Kansas
|align=left|
|-
|Loss
|
|align=left| Lonnie Smith
|UD
|10
|22/05/1998
|align=left| Odeum Expo Center, Villa Park, Illinois
|align=left|
|-
|Loss
|
|align=left| Francesco Cavalletti
|UD
|6
|19/05/1998
|align=left| Farm Bureau Building, Indianapolis, Indiana
|align=left|
|-
|Loss
|
|align=left| Michael Tucker
|UD
|4
|12/05/1998
|align=left| Flamingo Casino, Kansas City, Missouri
|align=left|
|-
|Loss
|
|align=left| Lawrence Chapman
|PTS
|4
|05/05/1998
|align=left| Nashville, Tennessee
|align=left|
|-
|Loss
|
|align=left| Jonathan Reid
|DQ
|3
|30/04/1998
|align=left| Columbia, Tennessee
|align=left|
|-
|Loss
|
|align=left| Anton Robinson
|PTS
|4
|28/04/1998
|align=left| Nashville, Tennessee
|align=left|
|-
|Loss
|
|align=left| Jerry Brown
|PTS
|4
|18/04/1998
|align=left| Owensboro, Kentucky
|align=left|
|-
|Win
|
|align=left| Darius Ashley
|KO
|2
|16/04/1998
|align=left| North Vernon, Indiana
|align=left|
|-
|Loss
|
|align=left| Sam Mahmoud
|UD
|4
|07/04/1998
|align=left| The Ambassador, Jennings, Missouri
|align=left|
|-
|Loss
|
|align=left| Purcell Miller
|UD
|8
|04/04/1998
|align=left| Johanning Civic Center, Kokomo, Indiana
|align=left|
|-
| Draw
|
|align=left| Michael Davis
|PTS
|4
|31/03/1998
|align=left| Nashville, Tennessee
|align=left|
|-
|Loss
|
|align=left| Leonard Walton
|UD
|4
|28/03/1998
|align=left| KC Market Center, Kansas City, Missouri
|align=left|
|-
|Loss
|
|align=left| Theo Elmore
|PTS
|4
|24/03/1998
|align=left| Nashville, Tennessee
|align=left|
|-
|Loss
|
|align=left| Dezi Ford
|PTS
|4
|10/03/1998
|align=left| Nashville, Tennessee
|align=left|
|-
|Loss
|
|align=left| Todd Foster
|UD
|8
|05/03/1998
|align=left| Coeur d'Alene Casino, Worley, Idaho
|align=left|
|-
|Loss
|
|align=left| John Williams
|UD
|8
|25/02/1998
|align=left| Columbia Club, Indianapolis, Indiana
|align=left|
|-
|Loss
|
|align=left| Tony Menefee
|UD
|6
|23/02/1998
|align=left| Remington's, Topeka, Kansas
|align=left|
|-
|Win
|
|align=left| Brent Cooper
|PTS
|4
|17/02/1998
|align=left| Nashville, Tennessee
|align=left|
|-
|Loss
|
|align=left| Tony Menefee
|UD
|4
|05/02/1998
|align=left| Harvey's Casino, Council Bluffs, Iowa
|align=left|
|-
|Loss
|
|align=left| Jimmy Hagar
|PTS
|4
|03/02/1998
|align=left| Nashville, Tennessee
|align=left|
|-
|Win
|
|align=left| Tom Gavin
|PTS
|4
|27/01/1998
|align=left| Nashville, Tennessee
|align=left|
|-
|Loss
|
|align=left| Jimmy Hagar
|PTS
|4
|20/01/1998
|align=left| Nashville, Tennessee
|align=left|
|-
|Win
|
|align=left| John Gutierrez
|TKO
|3
|06/01/1998
|align=left| Nashville, Tennessee
|align=left|
|-
|Loss
|
|align=left| Jimmy Hagar
|PTS
|4
|23/12/1997
|align=left| Nashville, Tennessee
|align=left|
|-
|Loss
|
|align=left| Theo Elmore
|PTS
|4
|16/12/1997
|align=left| Nashville, Tennessee
|align=left|
|-
|Loss
|
|align=left| Terrance Churchwell
|PTS
|4
|02/12/1997
|align=left| Nashville, Tennessee
|align=left|
|-
|Loss
|
|align=left| Kenny Bowman
|PTS
|4
|18/11/1997
|align=left| Nashville, Tennessee
|align=left|
|-
|Loss
|
|align=left| Theo Elmore
|SD
|10
|04/11/1997
|align=left| Nashville, Tennessee
|align=left|
|-
|Loss
|
|align=left| Delroy Leslie
|PTS
|6
|14/10/1997
|align=left| Nashville, Tennessee
|align=left|
|-
|Loss
|
|align=left| Kenny Ellis
|PTS
|10
|11/10/1997
|align=left| Peel's Palace, Erlanger, Kentucky
|align=left|
|-
|Loss
|
|align=left| Kelly Mays
|PTS
|4
|09/10/1997
|align=left| Louisville, Kentucky
|align=left|
|-
|Loss
|
|align=left| Delroy Leslie
|PTS
|4
|07/10/1997
|align=left| Nashville, Tennessee
|align=left|
|-
|Loss
|
|align=left| Angel Hernandez
|UD
|6
|01/10/1997
|align=left| Banana Joe's, Chicago, Illinois
|align=left|
|-
|Loss
|
|align=left| Shannon Landberg
|UD
|6
|30/09/1997
|align=left| Incahoots, Indianapolis, Indiana
|align=left|
|-
|Loss
|
|align=left| Warren Moore
|UD
|4
|25/09/1997
|align=left| The Showboat, East Chicago, Indiana
|align=left|
|-
|Win
|
|align=left| David Foster
|PTS
|4
|23/09/1997
|align=left| Nashville, Tennessee
|align=left|
|-
| Draw
|
|align=left| Jimmy Morgan
|PTS
|4
|16/09/1997
|align=left| Nashville Municipal Auditorium, Nashville, Tennessee
|align=left|
|-
|Loss
|
|align=left| Maurice Brantley
|UD
|6
|15/09/1997
|align=left| Argosy Casino, Kansas City, Missouri
|align=left|
|-
|Loss
|
|align=left| Manuel Lopez
|PTS
|6
|21/08/1997
|align=left| Denver, Colorado
|align=left|
|-
|Loss
|
|align=left| Eddie White
|KO
|1
|30/05/1997
|align=left| Ramada Inn, Rosemont, Illinois
|align=left|
|-
|Loss
|
|align=left| Earl Monroe
|PTS
|6
|22/05/1997
|align=left| Mobile, Alabama
|align=left|
|-
|Loss
|
|align=left| Jonathan Corn
|PTS
|8
|15/05/1997
|align=left| Green Bay, Wisconsin
|align=left|
|-
|Loss
|
|align=left| Robert West
|PTS
|8
|10/05/1997
|align=left| Circleville, Ohio
|align=left|
|-
|Win
|
|align=left| Brian Mitchell
|UD
|4
|29/04/1997
|align=left| Incahoots, Indianapolis, Indiana
|align=left|
|-
|Win
|
|align=left| Manuel Esparza
|MD
|4
|19/04/1997
|align=left| Highland High School, Anderson, Indiana
|align=left|
|-
|Loss
|
|align=left| Jason Curry
|PTS
|4
|14/03/1997
|align=left| River City Events Center, Fort Smith, Arkansas
|align=left|
|-
| Draw
|
|align=left| Brooke Wellby
|PTS
|6
|08/03/1997
|align=left| Veteran's Coliseum, Cedar Rapids, Iowa
|align=left|
|-
|Loss
|
|align=left|Anthony Lockett
|PTS
|4
|04/02/1997
|align=left| Memphis, Tennessee
|align=left|
|-
|Loss
|
|align=left|Zack Brewster
|PTS
|4
|28/01/1997
|align=left| Kansas
|align=left|
|-
|Loss
|
|align=left| Brooke Wellby
|SD
|6
|18/01/1997
|align=left| Veteran's Coliseum, Cedar Rapids, Iowa
|align=left|
|-
|Loss
|
|align=left| Tim Dendy
|PTS
|6
|03/12/1996
|align=left| Pyramid Arena, Memphis, Tennessee
|align=left|
|-
|Loss
|
|align=left| Jonathan Corn
|PTS
|6
|25/10/1996
|align=left| Hayward, Wisconsin
|align=left|
|-
|Loss
|
|align=left| Patrick Swann
|DQ
|6
|12/10/1996
|align=left| Albion Community Center, Albion, Iowa
|align=left|
|-
|Loss
|
|align=left| Richard Wilson Williams
|PTS
|4
|29/09/1996
|align=left| Louisville, Kentucky
|align=left|
|-
|Loss
|
|align=left| Tony Marshall
|UD
|10
|20/09/1996
|align=left| Erlanger, Kentucky
|align=left|
|-
|Loss
|
|align=left| Jesse Aquino
|UD
|4
|12/08/1996
|align=left| Beaumont Club, Kansas City, Missouri
|align=left|
|-
|Loss
|
|align=left| Randie Carver
|UD
|6
|05/08/1996
|align=left| Memorial Hall, Carthage, Missouri
|align=left|
|-
|Loss
|
|align=left| Jason Papillion
|PTS
|8
|13/07/1996
|align=left| Fort Smith, Arkansas
|align=left|
|-
|Loss
|
|align=left| Ron Essett
|PTS
|8
|04/06/1996
|align=left| Memphis, Tennessee
|align=left|
|-
|Win
|
|align=left| Steve Langley
|PTS
|6
|18/05/1996
|align=left| Bentonville, Arkansas
|align=left|
|-
|Draw
|
|align=left| Allen Smith
|PTS
|6
|19/04/1996
|align=left| Marriott Hotel, Des Moines, Iowa
|align=left|
|-
|Loss
|
|align=left| Ravea Springs
|PTS
|6
|06/04/1996
|align=left| Erlanger, Kentucky
|align=left|
|-
|Loss
|
|align=left| Nigel Reed
|UD
|6
|02/04/1996
|align=left| Memphis, Tennessee
|align=left|
|-
|Loss
|
|align=left| Lorenzo Smith
|UD
|6
|05/03/1996
|align=left| Memphis, Tennessee
|align=left|
|-
|Win
|
|align=left| Dwayne Swift
|UD
|6
|01/03/1996
|align=left| Louisville, Kentucky
|align=left|
|-
|Win
|
|align=left| Kenneth Kidd
|UD
|6
|07/02/1996
|align=left| Louisville, Kentucky
|align=left|
|-
|Loss
|
|align=left| Harold Roberts
|UD
|4
|05/02/1996
|align=left| Marriott Allis Plaza Hotel, Kansas City, Missouri
|align=left|
|-
|Win
|
|align=left| Larry Sutton
|UD
|4
|20/01/1996
|align=left| Erlanger, Kentucky
|align=left|
|-
|Loss
|
|align=left| Verdell Smith
|UD
|12
|18/01/1996
|align=left| Cain's Ballroom, Tulsa, Oklahoma
|align=left|.
|-
|Loss
|
|align=left| Buck Smith
|PTS
|8
|19/12/1995
|align=left| Oklahoma City, Oklahoma
|align=left|
|-
|Loss
|
|align=left| Ben Fielding
|SD
|6
|13/12/1995
|align=left| Youngstown, Ohio
|align=left|
|-
|Loss
|
|align=left| James Crawford
|PTS
|6
|04/12/1995
|align=left| Des Moines, Iowa
|align=left|
|-
|Loss
|
|align=left| Tyler Hughes
|PTS
|8
|02/11/1995
|align=left| Grand Island, Nebraska
|align=left|
|-
|Loss
|
|align=left| Arthur Allen
|PTS
|8
|18/10/1995
|align=left| Pittsburgh, Pennsylvania
|align=left|
|-
|Draw
|
|align=left| Mike Serr
|PTS
|6
|16/09/1995
|align=left| Mandan, North Dakota
|align=left|
|-
|Loss
|
|align=left| Clem Tucker Jr.
|PTS
|6
|10/09/1995
|align=left| Treasure Island Casino, Red Wing, Minnesota
|align=left|
|-
|Win
|
|align=left| Eugene George
|PTS
|5
|19/08/1995
|align=left| Cedar Rapids, Iowa
|align=left|
|-
|Loss
|
|align=left| Buck Smith
|PTS
|6
|03/08/1995
|align=left| Omaha, Nebraska
|align=left|
|-
|Loss
|
|align=left| Darrin Wagner
|PTS
|6
|14/07/1995
|align=left| Rochester, Minnesota
|align=left|
|-
|Win
|
|align=left| Rob Bleakley
|PTS
|6
|11/07/1995
|align=left| Kentucky
|align=left|
|-
|Draw
|
|align=left|Jay McMillan
|PTS
|6
|26/06/1995
|align=left| Kentucky
|align=left|
|-
|Win
|
|align=left| Kenneth Kidd
|PTS
|6
|06/06/1995
|align=left| Memphis, Tennessee
|align=left|
|-
|Draw
|
|align=left| Tyrone Moore
|PTS
|8
|05/06/1995
|align=left| Louisville, Kentucky
|align=left|
|-
|Loss
|
|align=left| Luciano Torres
|KO
|10
|24/04/1995
|align=left| Ribeirão Preto, Brazil
|align=left|
|-
|Loss
|
|align=left| Syd Vanderpool
|PTS
|8
|06/04/1995
|align=left| Erie, Pennsylvania
|align=left|
|-
|Loss
|
|align=left| Manning Galloway
|PTS
|6
|29/03/1995
|align=left| Shoemaker Center, Cincinnati
|align=left|
|-
|Loss
|
|align=left| Frank Minton
|PTS
|6
|28/03/1995
|align=left| Louisville, Kentucky
|align=left|
|-
|Win
|
|align=left| Felix Dubray
|SD
|4
|13/03/1995
|align=left| Lincoln, Nebraska
|align=left|
|-
|Loss
|
|align=left| Buck Smith
|PTS
|6
|05/03/1995
|align=left| Muskogee Civic Assembly Center, Muskogee, Oklahoma
|align=left|
|-
|Loss
|
|align=left| Harold Brazier
|PTS
|8
|28/02/1995
|align=left| Indianapolis, Indiana
|align=left|
|-
|Loss
|
|align=left| Lemark Davis
|UD
|8
|18/02/1995
|align=left| Toledo, Ohio
|
|-
|Win
|
|align=left| Richard Wilson Williams
|PTS
|6
|13/02/1995
|align=left| Louisville, Kentucky
|align=left|
|-
|Win
|
|align=left| Steve Langley
|PTS
|8
|07/02/1995
|align=left| Grand Island, Nebraska
|align=left|
|-
|Loss
|
|align=left| Tyrone Moore
|UD
|8
|24/01/1995
|align=left| Fort Mitchell, Kentucky
|align=left|
|-
|Win
|
|align=left| Tony Enna
|PTS
|6
|13/12/1994
|align=left| Kentucky
|align=left|
|-
|Loss
|
|align=left| Clem Tucker Jr.
|PTS
|6
|06/12/1994
|align=left| Memphis, Tennessee
|align=left|
|-
|Loss
|
|align=left| Tyrone Moore
|PTS
|6
|01/12/1994
|align=left| Louisville, Kentucky
|align=left|
|-
| Draw
|
|align=left| Sam Wilson
|PTS
|5
|19/11/1994
|align=left| Richmond, Kentucky
|align=left|
|-
|Loss
|
|align=left| Buck Smith
|UD
|6
|03/11/1994
|align=left| Capitol Plaza Hotel, Jefferson City, Missouri
|align=left|
|-
|Loss
|
|align=left| Dennis Allen
|PTS
|8
|28/10/1994
|align=left| Mandan, North Dakota
|align=left|
|-
|Win
|
|align=left| Jay Clark
|PTS
|6
|27/10/1994
|align=left| Niles, Ohio
|align=left|
|-
|Loss
|
|align=left| Anwar Oshana
|UD
|4
|13/10/1994
|align=left| Rialto Square Theatre, Joliet, Illinois
|align=left|
|-
|Loss
|
|align=left| Dan Connolly
|PTS
|8
|06/10/1994
|align=left| Monroeville, Pennsylvania
|align=left|
|-
|Loss
|
|align=left| Buck Smith
|PTS
|6
|17/09/1994
|align=left| Des Moines, Iowa
|align=left|
|-
|Win
|
|align=left| Jay Clark
|UD
|4
|27/08/1994
|align=left| Veteran's Coliseum, Cedar Rapids, Iowa
|align=left|
|-
|Win
|
|align=left| Kenny Willis
|SD
|6
|15/08/1994
|align=left| Fort Mitchell, Kentucky
|align=left|
|-
|Loss
|
|align=left| Tony Menefee
|PTS
|8
|04/08/1994
|align=left| Council Bluffs, Iowa
|align=left|
|-
|Loss
|
|align=left| Cecil Pettigrew
|DQ
|8
|22/07/1994
|align=left| Brady Theater, Tulsa, Oklahoma
|align=left|
|-
|Win
|
|align=left| Kevin Phillips
|PTS
|6
|27/06/1994
|align=left| Fort Mitchell, Kentucky
|align=left|
|-
|Win
|
|align=left| Charlie Negrete
|PTS
|6
|16/06/1994
|align=left| Des Moines, Iowa
|align=left|
|-
|Win
|
|align=left| Kevin Phillips
|PTS
|6
|11/06/1994
|align=left| South Bend, Indiana
|align=left|
|-
| NC
|
|align=left| Tony Enna
|ND
|8
|24/05/1994
|align=left| Saint Louis, Missouri
|align=left|
|-
|Win
|
|align=left| Tony Enna
|PTS
|6
|21/05/1994
|align=left| Louisville, Kentucky
|align=left|
|-
|Loss
|
|align=left| Harold Brazier
|PTS
|8
|16/05/1994
|align=left| Louisville, Kentucky
|align=left|
|-
|Loss
|
|align=left| Ray Domenge
|PTS
|6
|12/05/1994
|align=left| Omaha, Nebraska
|align=left|
|-
|Loss
|
|align=left| Gary Kirkland
|PTS
|8
|06/05/1994
|align=left| Terre Haute, Indiana
|align=left|
|-
|Loss
|
|align=left| Tony Enna
|PTS
|6
|02/05/1994
|align=left| Kansas City, Kansas
|align=left|
|-
| Draw
|
|align=left| Tony Enna
|PTS
|6
|28/04/1994
|align=left| Springfield, Missouri
|align=left|
|-
|Loss
|
|align=left| Terrence Kelly
|PTS
|6
|26/04/1994
|align=left| Louisville, Kentucky
|align=left|
|-
|Loss
|
|align=left| Alex Ramos
|PTS
|8
|25/04/1994
|align=left| Des Moines, Iowa
|align=left|
|-
|Loss
|
|align=left| Rob Bleakley
|PTS
|10
|16/04/1994
|align=left| Spencer, Iowa
|align=left|
|-
|Win
|
|align=left| Mark Brannon
|PTS
|6
|12/04/1994
|align=left| Kansas City, Missouri
|align=left|
|-
|Loss
|
|align=left| Rob Bleakley
|UD
|6
|11/04/1994
|align=left| Louisville, Kentucky
|align=left|
|-
|Loss
|
|align=left| Rob Bleakley
|PTS
|8
|07/04/1994
|align=left| Council Bluffs, Iowa
|align=left|
|-
|Loss
|
|align=left| Marty Jakubowski
|PTS
|6
|05/04/1994
|align=left| Memphis, Tennessee
|align=left|
|-
|Win
|
|align=left| Marty Wolfe
|PTS
|6
|02/04/1994
|align=left| Manchester, Kentucky
|align=left|
|-
|Loss
|
|align=left| Ricky Ramirez
|PTS
|4
|19/03/1994
|align=left| Des Moines, Iowa
|align=left|
|-
| Draw
|
|align=left| Justin Racine
|PTS
|6
|06/03/1994
|align=left| North Dakota
|align=left|
|-
|Loss
|
|align=left| Raúl Márquez
|TKO
|1
|14/01/1994
|align=left| Chicago, Illinois
|align=left|
|-
|Loss
|
|align=left| Leonard Townsend
|UD
|6
|17/12/1993
|align=left| Union Hall, Countryside, Illinois
|align=left|
|-
|Loss
|
|align=left| Keith Holmes
|UD
|8
|02/12/1993
|align=left| Louisville, Kentucky
|align=left|
|-
|Win
|
|align=left| Kenny Brown
|PTS
|6
|13/11/1993
|align=left| Greensburg, Indiana
|align=left|
|-
| Draw
|
|align=left| Pat Briceno
|PTS
|6
|05/11/1993
|align=left| Melrose Park Civic Center, Melrose Park, Illinois
|align=left|
|-
|Loss
|
|align=left| Rob Bleakley
|UD
|12
|30/10/1993
|align=left| Veteran's Coliseum, Cedar Rapids, Iowa
|align=left|
|-
|Loss
|
|align=left| Marty Jakubowski
|PTS
|6
|27/10/1993
|align=left| Wichita, Kansas
|align=left|
|-
| Draw
|
|align=left| Terry Lee Thomas
|PTS
|4
|23/10/1993
|align=left| Indianapolis, Indiana
|align=left|
|-
|Win
|16–90 
|align=left| Aaron McLaurine
|PTS
|6
|22/10/1993
|align=left| Kentucky
|align=left|
|-
|Loss
|15–90 
|align=left| Rob Bleakley
|PTS
|4
|18/10/1993
|align=left| Kentucky
|align=left|
|-
|Loss
|15–89 
|align=left| Harold Roberts
|PTS
|4
|16/10/1993
|align=left| Bristol, Tennessee
|align=left|
|-
|Loss
|15–88 
|align=left| Harold Brazier
|PTS
|10
|07/10/1993
|align=left| Iowa
|align=left|
|-
|Loss
|15–87 
|align=left| Marty Jakubowski
|UD
|6
|04/10/1993
|align=left| Marriott Downtown, Kansas City, Missouri
|align=left|
|-
|Loss
|15–86 
|align=left| TD Wortham
|PTS
|10
|01/10/1993
|align=left| Continental Inn, Lexington, Kentucky
|align=left|
|-
|Loss
|15–85 
|align=left| Leonard Townsend
|PTS
|6
|17/09/1993
|align=left| Union Hall, Countryside, Illinois
|align=left|
|-
|Loss
|15–84 
|align=left| Tim Payton
|PTS
|6
|13/09/1993
|align=left| Kentucky
|align=left|
|-
|Win
|15–83 
|align=left| Todd McMurrin
|PTS
|4
|11/09/1993
|align=left| Waubeek, Iowa
|align=left|
|-
|Win
|14–83 
|align=left| Gerald Reed
|PTS
|4
|09/08/1993
|align=left| Louisville, Kentucky
|align=left|
|-
|Win
|13–83 
|align=left| Dave Traynor
|PTS
|4
|05/08/1993
|align=left| Council Bluffs, Iowa
|align=left|
|-
|Win
|12–83 
|align=left| Richie White
|PTS
|4
|04/08/1993
|align=left| Des Moines, Iowa
|align=left|
|-
|Loss
|11–83 
|align=left| Justin Racine
|PTS
|6
|26/06/1993
|align=left| Dillon, Montana
|align=left|
|-
|Loss
|11–82 
|align=left| Dave Traynor
|SD
|4
|17/06/1993
|align=left| Council Bluffs, Iowa
|align=left|
|-
|Loss
|11–81 
|align=left| Heath Todd
|PTS
|6
|16/06/1993
|align=left| Marriott Downtown, Kansas City, Kansas
|align=left|
|-
|Loss
|11–80 
|align=left| Terry Acker
|PTS
|8
|15/05/1993
|align=left| Bessemer Civic Center, Bessemer, Alabama
|align=left|
|-
|Loss
|11–79 
|align=left| Tony Menefee
|TKO
|4
|01/05/1993
|align=left| Lincoln, Nebraska
|align=left|
|-
|Loss
|11–78 
|align=left| Harold Brazier
|PTS
|8
|29/04/1993
|align=left| Elkhart, Indiana
|align=left|
|-
|Win
|11–77 
|align=left| Jim Kaczmarek
|UD
|5
|21/04/1993
|align=left| Louisville, Kentucky
|align=left|
|-
|Loss
|10–77 
|align=left| Gary Kirkland
|PTS
|6
|13/04/1993
|align=left| Hammond, Indiana
|align=left|
|-
|Loss
|10–76 
|align=left| Tony Enna
|PTS
|4
|12/04/1993
|align=left| Marriott Downtown, Kansas City, Missouri
|align=left|
|-
|Loss
|10–75 
|align=left| Clayton Williams
|UD
|4
|10/04/1993
|align=left| Lewistown, Montana
|align=left|
|-
|Win
|10–74 
|align=left| George Albert Reedy
|UD
|4
|07/04/1993
|align=left| Louisville, Kentucky
|align=left|
|-
|Loss
|9–74 
|align=left| Kenny Willis
|PTS
|6
|31/03/1993
|align=left| Louisville, Kentucky
|align=left|
|-
|Loss
|9–73 
|align=left| Chris Snyder
|PTS
|8
|28/03/1993
|align=left| Metroplex Hotel, Youngstown, Ohio
|align=left|
|-
|Loss
|9–72 
|align=left| Tony Ray Kern
|UD
|5
|10/03/1993
|align=left| Louisville, Kentucky
|align=left|
|-
|Loss
|9–71 
|align=left| Tim Payton
|SD
|6
|05/03/1993
|align=left| Louisville, Kentucky
|align=left|
|-
|Loss
|9–70 
|align=left| Marty Jakubowski
|UD
|8
|03/03/1993
|align=left| Louisville, Kentucky
|align=left|
|-
|Win
|9–69 
|align=left| Jason Quillen
|UD
|4
|02/03/1993
|align=left| Somerset, Kentucky
|align=left|
|-
|Loss
|8–69 
|align=left| Tim Payton
|PTS
|8
|24/02/1993
|align=left| Kentucky
|align=left|
|-
|Loss
|8–68 
|align=left| Justin Racine
|PTS
|6
|19/02/1993
|align=left| Mandan, North Dakota
|align=left|
|-
|Win
|8–67 
|align=left| Ben Tafari
|PTS
|4
|17/02/1993
|align=left| Louisville, Kentucky
|align=left|
|-
|Loss
|7–67 
|align=left| Shannon Landberg
|PTS
|6
|10/02/1993
|align=left| Louisville, Kentucky
|align=left|
|-
|Loss
|7–66 
|align=left| Bobby Amsler
|UD
|6
|06/02/1993
|align=left| Bristol, Tennessee
|align=left|
|-
|Loss
|7–65 
|align=left| Vinny Letizia
|KO
|3
|25/11/1992
|align=left| Countryside, Illinois
|align=left|
|-
|Loss
|7–64 
|align=left| Tocker Pudwill
|PTS
|8
|21/11/1992
|align=left| Mandan, North Dakota
|align=left|
|-
|Loss
|7–63 
|align=left| Bobby Amsler
|MD
|6
|27/10/1992
|align=left| Century Center, South Bend, Indiana
|align=left|
|-
|Loss
|7–62 
|align=left| Giovanni Nardiello
|PTS
|6
|03/10/1992
|align=left| Palaghiaccio de Marino, Marino, Lazio
|align=left|
|-
|Loss
|7–61 
|align=left| Heath Todd
|KO
|4
|17/08/1992
|align=left| Allis Plaza Hotel, Kansas City, Missouri
|align=left|
|-
|Loss
|7–60 
|align=left| Roni Martinez
|UD
|4
|14/08/1992
|align=left| Lexington, Kentucky
|align=left|
|-
|Loss
|7–59 
|align=left| Jeff Johnson
|PTS
|6
|08/08/1992
|align=left| Demopolis, Alabama
|align=left|
|-
|Loss
|7–58 
|align=left| Wendell Hall
|DQ
|6
|31/07/1992
|align=left| Lexington, Kentucky
|align=left|
|-
|Loss
|7–57 
|align=left| Jeff Whaley
|PTS
|4
|24/07/1992
|align=left| Lexington, Kentucky
|align=left|
|-
|Loss
|7–56 
|align=left| Wendell Hall
|MD
|4
|10/07/1992
|align=left| Lexington, Kentucky
|align=left|
|-
|Win
|7–55 
|align=left| Pat Johnson
|PTS
|6
|14/06/1992
|align=left| Columbus, Indiana
|align=left|
|-
|Loss
|6–55 
|align=left| Availeo Slate
|PTS
|4
|12/06/1992
|align=left| Columbus, Ohio
|align=left|
|-
|Loss
|6–54 
|align=left| Robert Curry
|PTS
|6
|11/06/1992
|align=left| Beckley, West Virginia
|align=left|
|-
|Loss
|6–53 
|align=left| Robert Briggs
|UD
|8
|29/05/1992
|align=left| Struthers, Ohio
|align=left|
|-
|Loss
|6–52 
|align=left| Guy Stanford
|PTS
|4
|23/05/1992
|align=left| Hendersonville, Tennessee
|align=left|
|-
|Loss
|6–51 
|align=left| Larry LaCoursiere
|PTS
|10
|03/05/1992
|align=left| Columbus, Indiana
|align=left|
|-
|Loss
|6–50 
|align=left| Carlton Haywood
|PTS
|6
|24/04/1992
|align=left| Atlanta
|align=left|
|-
|Loss
|6–49 
|align=left| Darryl Lattimore
|TKO
|4
|18/04/1992
|align=left| George Washington Junior High, Alexandria, Virginia
|align=left|
|-
|Loss
|6–48 
|align=left| Jeff Johnson
|PTS
|8
|28/02/1992
|align=left| Decatur, Georgia
|align=left|
|-
|Win
|6–47 
|align=left|Ken Jackson
|TKO
|2
|26/02/1992
|align=left| Kentucky
|align=left|
|-
|Loss
|5–47 
|align=left| Matthew Charleston
|PTS
|10
|11/01/1992
|align=left| Nashville, Tennessee
|align=left|
|-
|Loss
|5–46 
|align=left|Mark Daniels
|UD
|6
|06/01/1992
|align=left| Saint Louis, Missouri
|align=left|
|-
| NC
|5–45 
|align=left| James Lonaker
|ND
|5
|18/12/1991
|align=left| Columbus, Indiana
|align=left|
|-
|Loss
|5–45
|align=left| Mike Evgen
|PTS
|6
|16/12/1991
|align=left| Minneapolis, Minnesota
|align=left|
|-
|Loss
|5–44
|align=left| Don Wilford
|UD
|6
|07/12/1991
|align=left| Nashville, Tennessee
|align=left|
|-
|Win
|5–43
|align=left| Jack McGlathin
|KO
|2
|26/10/1991
|align=left| Indianapolis, Indiana
|align=left|
|-
|Loss
|4–43
|align=left| Matthew Charleston
|PTS
|8
|24/10/1991
|align=left| Decatur, Georgia
|align=left|
|-
|Loss
|4–42
|align=left| James Lonaker
|TKO
|8
|14/09/1991
|align=left| Columbus, Indiana
|align=left|
|-
|Loss
|4–41
|align=left| Jim Combs
|KO
|1
|20/07/1991
|align=left| Oakdale, Louisiana
|align=left|
|-
|Loss
|4–40
|align=left| Anthony Stephens
|TKO
|3
|12/07/1991
|align=left| Minneapolis, Minnesota
|align=left|
|-
|Loss
|4–39
|align=left|Terry Guthrie
|PTS
|4
|24/05/1991
|align=left| Carthage, Missouri
|align=left|
|-
|Loss
|4–38
|align=left| Shane Lanham
|PTS
|4
|25/03/1991
|align=left| Kentucky
|align=left|
|-
|Loss
|4–37
|align=left| Gary Kirkland
|PTS
|4
|08/03/1991
|align=left| Hammond Civic Center, Hammond, Indiana
|align=left|
|-
|Loss
|4–36
|align=left| Jim Kaczmarek
|SD
|4
|25/02/1991
|align=left| Century Center, South Bend, Indiana
|align=left|
|-
|Loss
|4–35
|align=left| Brian Keith Brown
|PTS
|6
|28/12/1990
|align=left| Lexington, Kentucky
|align=left|
|-
|Win
|4–34
|align=left| Tim Brown
|UD
|4
|14/11/1990
|align=left| Diamond's, Lexington, Kentucky
|align=left|
|-
|Loss
|3–34
|align=left| Randy Cross
|TKO
|1
|19/10/1990
|align=left| Saint Louis, Missouri
|align=left|
|-
|Loss
|3–33
|align=left| Shane Lanham
|PTS
|4
|06/10/1990
|align=left| Murray, Kentucky
|align=left|
|-
|Loss
|3–32
|align=left| Michael Dann Taylor
|PTS
|4
|20/09/1990
|align=left| Elkhart, Indiana
|align=left|
|-
|Loss
|3–31
|align=left| Mickle Orr
|PTS
|4
|18/09/1990
|align=left| Indianapolis, Indiana
|align=left|
|-
|Win
|3–30
|align=left| Albert Grady
|SD
|6
|14/09/1990
|align=left| Beloit, Wisconsin
|align=left|
|-
|Loss
|2–30
|align=left| Pat Coleman
|UD
|4
|12/09/1990
|align=left| Gateway Theatre, Chicago, Illinois
|align=left|
|-
|Loss
|2–29
|align=left| John Lark
|TKO
|2
|15/06/1990
|align=left| Scott County Middle School, Georgetown, Kentucky
|align=left|
|-
|Loss
|2–28
|align=left| Jeff Bumpus
|UD
|6
|11/06/1990
|align=left| Century Center, South Bend, Indiana
|align=left|
|-
|Loss
|2–27
|align=left| Kenny Brown
|UD
|4
|22/05/1990
|align=left| Sherwood Club, Indianapolis, Indiana
|align=left|
|-
|Loss
|2–26
|align=left| Shane Lanham
|DQ
|4
|11/05/1990
|align=left| Covington, Kentucky
|align=left|
|-
|Loss
|2–25
|align=left| Bruce Nuby
|PTS
|8
|16/03/1990
|align=left| Covington, Kentucky
|align=left|
|-
|Loss
|2–24
|align=left| Kenny Brown
|PTS
|5
|27/02/1990
|align=left| Indianapolis, Indiana
|align=left|
|-
|Loss
|2–23
|align=left| Terry Lee Thomas
|UD
|8
|13/02/1990
|align=left| Sherwood Club, Indianapolis, Indiana
|align=left|
|-
|Loss
|2–22
|align=left| Kelvin Williams
|TKO
|3
|05/12/1989
|align=left| Park West, Chicago, Illinois
|align=left|
|-
|Loss
|2–21
|align=left| Mike Garrow
|PTS
|4
|22/11/1989
|align=left| Sheraton Hotel, Pittsburgh, Pennsylvania
|align=left|
|-
|Loss
|2–20
|align=left| Rodney Wilson
|UD
|6
|10/11/1989
|align=left| Chicago International Amphitheatre, Chicago, Illinois
|align=left|
|-
|Loss
|2–19
|align=left| Parrish Johnson
|TKO
|3
|30/09/1989
|align=left| La Vergne, Tennessee
|align=left|
|-
|Loss
|2–18
|align=left| Parrish Johnson
|PTS
|4
|31/08/1989
|align=left| Memphis, Tennessee
|align=left|
|-
|Loss
|2–17
|align=left| Eric Whitfield
|TKO
|4
|26/08/1989
|align=left| Murray, Kentucky
|align=left|
|-
|Loss
|2–16
|align=left| Rodney Wilson
|KO
|2
|06/06/1989
|align=left| Park West, Chicago, Illinois
|align=left|
|-
|Loss
|2–15
|align=left| Willie Ball
|TKO
|1
|05/06/1989
|align=left| Henry VIII Hotel, Saint Louis, Missouri
|align=left|
|-
|Loss
|2–14
|align=left| Tim Brown
|SD
|4
|22/05/1989
|align=left| Yankee Doodle's, Bowling Green, Kentucky
|align=left|
|-
|Loss
|2–13
|align=left| John Lark
|PTS
|4
|18/05/1989
|align=left| Hyatt Hotel, Lexington, Kentucky
|align=left|
|-
|Loss
|2–12
|align=left| Terry Southerland
|DQ
|1
|08/05/1989
|align=left| Erlanger, Kentucky
|align=left|
|-
|Loss
|2–11
|align=left| Lorenzo Smith
|UD
|4
|02/05/1989
|align=left| Park West, Chicago
|align=left|
|-
|Loss
|2–10
|align=left| Tracy Muse
|UD
|6
|26/04/1989
|align=left| La Fontaine Bleue, Glen Burnie, Maryland
|align=left|
|-
|Win
|2–9
|align=left| Willard Johnson
|PTS
|4
|15/04/1989
|align=left| Louisville, Kentucky
|align=left|
|-
|Loss
|1–9
|align=left| James Sudberry
|PTS
|4
|07/03/1989
|align=left| Erlanger, Kentucky
|align=left|
|-
|Loss
|1–8
|align=left| Matthew Thompson
|PTS
|4
|12/11/1988
|align=left| Bristol Sports Arena, Bristol, Tennessee
|align=left|
|-
|Loss
|1–7
|align=left| Roland Commings
|TKO
|2
|18/11/1987
|align=left| Maronite Center, Youngstown, Ohio
|align=left|
|-
|Loss
|1–6
|align=left| Alain Langlois
|KO
|2
|14/10/1987
|align=left| Toronto
|align=left|
|-
|Loss
|1–5
|align=left| Tom Tipton
|PTS
|4
|31/07/1987
|align=left| Sadowski Field House, Fort Knox, Kentucky
|align=left|
|-
|Loss
|1–4
|align=left| Remo Di Carlo
|TKO
|2
|23/06/1987
|align=left| Concert Hall, Toronto, Ontario
|align=left|
|-
|Loss
|1–3
|align=left| Sammy Rivera
|TKO
|2
|09/05/1987
|align=left| Bristol, Tennessee
|align=left|
|-
|Loss
|1–2
|align=left| Mark Brannon
|UD
|4
|29/04/1987
|align=left| National Guard Armory, Richmond, Kentucky
|align=left|
|-
|Win
|1–1
|align=left|Thomas Burton
|TKO
|3
|28/03/1987
|align=left| Newport, Kentucky
|align=left|
|-
|Loss
|0–1 
|align=left| Ellery Thomas
|UD
|4
|06/01/1987
|align=left| Premier Center, Sterling Heights, Michigan
|align=left|
|}

References

External links
 

|-

|-

1968 births
Living people
Boxers from Cincinnati
American male boxers
Super-middleweight boxers